Rainer Spanagel is a professor of psychopharmacology at the Central Institute of Mental Health (Mannheim) of Heidelberg University, where he is director of the Institute of Psychopharmacology. He is editor-in-chief of the medical journal Addiction Biology. His main research interest is drug abuse, especially alcohol dependence. In 2018 he received the Distinguished Scientist Award of the International Behavioural and Neural Genetics Society.

References

German neuroscientists
Living people
Year of birth missing (living people)